See also Earl of Winchilsea

Earl of Nottingham is a title that has been created seven times in the Peerage of England. It was first created for John de Mowbray in 1377, at the coronation of Richard II. As this creation could only pass to his legitimate heirs, it went extinct on his death in 1383. It was re-created for his elder brother Thomas de Mowbray in the same year, however. This branch of the family became Dukes of Norfolk, and the title would descend with them until John de Mowbray died without male heirs in 1476.

The third creation was for Richard of Shrewsbury, Duke of York, son of Edward IV and one of the Princes in the Tower. Richard was imprisoned by his uncle Richard III (then Lord Protector), disappearing shortly after, presumed murdered.

The earldom was briefly recreated in 1483 for the 4th time for William Berkeley, who later became Marquess of Berkeley.  Then in 1525, the earldom was recreated for the 5th time for Henry Fitzroy, Duke of Richmond and Somerset and illegitimate son of Henry VIII. Both died childless within ten years of being granted the title.

The sixth creation was for Charles Howard, Lord High Admiral for Elizabeth I and James VI and I. He was commander of the English navy against the Spanish Armada, and a notable statesman in both reigns. His descendants held the earldom until 1681.

The current, seventh, creation was made in 1681 for Heneage Finch, 1st Earl of Nottingham, who died one year later. Before being created earl he was the Attorney General and Lord Chancellor, and played an active part in the aftermath of the Popish Plot. His son Daniel Finch inherited the Earldom of Winchilsea in 1729. The second earl was a prominent politician, serving as Lord President of the Council, Secretary of State for the Northern and Southern Departments, and First Lord of the Admiralty.

For subsequent family history, see Earl of Winchilsea and Nottingham.

The title is currently held by Daniel Finch-Hatton, 17th Earl of Winchilsea and 12th Earl of Nottingham.

Earls of Nottingham, First creation (1377)
 John de Mowbray (1365-1383), 5th Baron Mowbray

Earls of Nottingham, Second creation (1383)
 Thomas de Mowbray, 1st Duke of Norfolk (1366-1399), Lord Mowbray
 Thomas de Mowbray, 4th Earl of Norfolk (1385-1405), Lord Mowbray

see the Duke of Norfolk (1397 creation) for the other Earls

Earl of Nottingham, Third creation (1476)
Richard of Shrewsbury, 1st Duke of York (1473–1483)

Earl of Nottingham, Fourth creation (1483)
William Berkeley, 1st Marquess of Berkeley (1426–1492)

Earl of Nottingham, Fifth creation (1525)
Henry FitzRoy, 1st Duke of Richmond and Somerset (1519–1536)

Earls of Nottingham, Sixth creation (1596)
see the Earl of Effingham

Earls of Nottingham, Seventh creation (1681)
see the Earl of Winchilsea and Nottingham

Earldoms in the Peerage of England
Extinct earldoms in the Peerage of England
Noble titles created in 1377
Noble titles created in 1383
Noble titles created in 1476
Noble titles created in 1483
Noble titles created in 1525
Noble titles created in 1596
Noble titles created in 1681